Le Passage is a commune in the Isère department in southeastern France.

Geography
The Bourbre forms the commune's southeastern border.

Population

See also
Communes of the Isère department

References

Passage
Isère communes articles needing translation from French Wikipedia